Archbold's bowerbird (Archboldia papuensis) is a medium-sized, dark grey songbird with brown iris, grey feet and black bill. They can grow up to 37 cm long. The male has narrow black scalloping with some trace of golden yellow crown feathers and dark grey forked tail, that shorter than the wing. Both sexes are similar. The female is smaller than male, with yellow patch on wings and has no crown feathering.

Archbold's bowerbird is distributed and endemic to highland forests of Western New Guinea.

This little known bowerbird was discovered by Austin Loomer Rand in 1939. The name commemorates the New Guinea explorer and ornithologist Richard Archbold. It is notable for going to great lengths in acquiring shed ornamental plumes of the King of Saxony bird-of-paradise for decorating its courtship bower.

The Archbold's bowerbird is evaluated as least concern on the IUCN Red List of Threatened Species.

References

External links
 BirdLife Species Factsheet

Archbold's bowerbird
Birds of Western New Guinea
Archbold's bowerbird
Taxa named by Austin L. Rand